Fragment processing is a term in computer graphics referring to a collection of operations applied to fragments generated by the rasterization operation in the rendering pipeline.

During the rendering of computer graphics, the rasterization step takes a primitive, described by its vertex coordinates with associated color and texture information, and converts it into a set of fragments.  These fragments then undergo a series of processing steps, e.g. scissor test, alpha test, depth test, stencil test, blending, texture mapping and so on. These steps are collectively referred to as fragment processing.

See also
 Computer representation of surfaces
 Glossary of computer graphics
 Graphical perception
 Spatial visualization ability
 Visualization (graphics)

References

3D rendering